Penicillium jensenii is an anamorph species of the genus of Penicillium which produces citrinin, griseofulvin and fumagillin.

Further reading

References

jensenii
Fungi described in 1927